Piz Minschuns (Romansh) or Schafberg (German) is a mountain in the Fallaschkamm mountains, a subgroup of the Ortler Alps, more precisely on the eastern edge of the Val Costainas, located on the border between Italy and Switzerland.

References

External links
 Piz Minschuns on Hikr

Mountains of the Alps
Mountains of Graubünden
Mountains of South Tyrol
Italy–Switzerland border
International mountains of Europe
Ortler Alps
Mountains of Switzerland
Two-thousanders of Switzerland